Why I am not going back to the Soviet Union is an anti-establishment pamphlet authored by Ivan Bahrianyi. It outlines Bahrianyi's own (political) declaration of national dignity, as well as his views on the importance of human rights. The essay opens with the sentence, "I am one of those thousands of people, Ukrainians, who, to the bewilderment of the entire world, do not want to return home to bolshevik rule."

References

Bibliography 
 Listratenko, Nataliya Volodymyrivna ed. Ukrayina: knyha faktiv (Ukraine: the book of facts). Knyzhkovyi Klub, Kharkiv, 2006:214.
 Ivan Dziuba M Civil and Political Insight / / About journalism Bahrianyi I. / I. Crimson. Journalism. - K. Torch., 1996.
Ukrainian literature